Júlia da Silva Bruhns (August 14, 1851March 11, 1923) was a German-Brazilian writer. She was the wife of the Lübeck senator and grain merchant Johann Heinrich Mann, and also mother of writers Thomas Mann and Heinrich Mann.

Biography 
Júlia, a Roman Catholic, was born in Paraty, Brazil, the daughter of a German farmer Johann Ludwig Herman Bruhns and Brazilian Maria Luísa da Silva, the daughter of a Portuguese immigrant and a lady who also had South American Indigenous blood. Júlia's father owned several sugar cane plantations between Santos and Rio de Janeiro. Her mother died in childbirth at 28 when Júlia was six. She had three brothers and one sister. One year after her mother's death, her father decided to send his children back to Germany. They lived in Lübeck, where Júlia had an uncle. At six, Julia didn’t speak a word of German. She stayed in a boarding school until she was 14 years old, while her father was back in Brazil caring for the farms.

After the death of her husband and as consequence of a bladder surgery, Júlia went to live in Munich with her children.

She wrote an autobiographical work called Aus Dodos Kindheit, in which she described her idyllic childhood in Brazil.

Her sons Heinrich and Thomas created characters inspired by her in several of their books, referring to her South American blood and passionate artistic temperament. Thomas Mann describes Júlia as "Portuguese-Creole Brazilian". In Buddenbrooks she was the inspiration for Gerda Arnoldsen and Toni Buddenbrook. In Doktor Faustus, she became the wife of Senator Rodde. In Tonio Kröger, she was the mother, Consuelo. In Death in Venice, she appears as the mother of the protagonist, Gustav von Aschenbach.

Personal life
She married Thomas Johann Heinrich Mann in 1869. She was 17, he 29. They had five children: Heinrich (Luís), Thomas (Paulo), Julia (Elisabeth Therese/Lula), Carla (Augusta Olga Maria), and Viktor (Carl).

Her two daughters both committed suicide: Carla poisoned herself in 1910, and Lula hanged herself in 1927.

Death
In her later years Júlia moved frequently and lived mostly in hotels. She died in a hotel room in Weßling, Bavaria, watched over by her three sons.

See also 
Dohm–Mann family tree

Further reading

Short biography (in German)
Miskolci, Richard. Thomas Mann: Artista Mestiço. São Paulo: Annablume/FAPESP, 2003.

1851 births
1923 deaths
People from Paraty
Brazilian people of German descent
German people of Brazilian descent
Brazilian people of Portuguese descent
German people of Portuguese descent
Brazilian people of indigenous peoples descent
Brazilian writers
German women writers
Brazilian emigrants to Germany
Mann family